Simone Franciosi (born 3 September 2001) is a Sammarinese footballer who plays as a defender for A.S.D. Valfoglia and the San Marino national team.

Career
Franciosi made his international debut for San Marino on 26 September 2022 in a UEFA Nations League match against Estonia, which finished as a 0–4 home loss.

Career statistics

International

References

2001 births
Living people
Sammarinese footballers
San Marino youth international footballers
San Marino under-21 international footballers
San Marino international footballers
Association football defenders